Gaydos is a surname. Notable people with the name include:

John R. Gaydos (born 1943), American Roman Catholic bishop
Joseph M. Gaydos (1926–2015), American politician
Kent Gaydos (born 1949), American football wide receiver
Michael Gaydos, American comics artist
Steven Gaydos, American screenwriter, songwriter and journalist